The  was a DC electric multiple unit (EMU) commuter train type operated by the private operator Keikyu on commuter services in the Tokyo area of Japan from 1967 until 2005. 

The 700 series was the first Keikyu stock type to have 4 doors on each side. A total of 84 cars were built between 1967 and 1971.

The fleet was withdrawn between 1998 and 2005, and 20 cars were transferred to Takamatsu Electric Railway.

Interior
Passenger accommodation consisted of longitudinal bench seating throughout.

History

A total of 84 vehicles (21 four-car sets) were built between 1967 and 1971, initially without air-conditioning. The entire fleet was refurbished between 1980 and 1988, including the retro-fitting of air-conditioning.

Withdrawals started in 1998. A farewell ceremony was held at Keikyu Kawasaki Station on 28 November 2005, with the last revenue workings continuing on the Keikyu Daishi Line until 30 November.

Resale

A number of 700 series cars were resold to the Takamatsu-Kotohira Electric Railroad ("Kotoden") in Shikoku, where they became the 2-car 1200 series. The identities and histories of the 700 series cars sold to Kotoden are as shown below.

References

Electric multiple units of Japan
700 series
Train-related introductions in 1967
Kawasaki multiple units
1500 V DC multiple units of Japan
Tokyu Car multiple units